Claudio Cecchetto (born 19 April 1952) is an Italian record producer and talent scout.

Life and career 
Cecchetto was born in Ceggia, (metropolitan city of Venice). He has hosted several Italian music festivals, from Festival di Sanremo to Festivalbar, and many television programs throughout his career. Following a spell at Radio 105 Network, he founded the stations Radio DeeJay and Radio Capital.

He is also known for being the talent scout for several musical artists and television personalities, including Gerry Scotti, Jovanotti, Fiorello, Sabrina Salerno, 883, Nikki, B-nario, Albertino, DJ Linus, Luca Laurenti, Marco Mazzoli, Daniele Bossari, Fabio Volo, Tracy Spencer, Taffy, Leonardo Pieraccioni, DJ Francis (aka Francesco Facchinetti) and more recent acts like Finley. Cecchetto was also a performer; his song "Gioca-Jouer" topped the Italian hit parade in 1981.

Personal life 
In the spring of 1992, he married Maria Paola Danna in Riccione. They have two children, Jody Cecchetto (born in 1994) and Leonardo Cecchetto (born in 2000).

Television appearances 

Chewing Gum (Telemilano 58, 1978)
Discoring (Rete 1, 1979–1982)
Festival of Sanremo (Rete 1, 1980-81-82)
Checkmate (Rete 1, 1980)
Fantastico 2 (Rete 1, 1981)
Popcorn (Canale 5, 1982–1983)
Premiatissima (Canale 5, 1982)
Festivalbar (Canale 5, 1983/1987, Italia 1, 1993)
Deejay Television (Canale 5, Italia 1, 1983/1990)
Azzurro (Italia 1, 1984, 1987)
Supersanremo (Italia 1, 1984–1985)
Zodiaco (Italia 1, 1985)
Vote the Voice (Canale 5, 1985–1986)
Festival di Castrocaro (Rai Uno, 1992,1993,2002)
Un disco per l'estate (Rai Uno, 1994)
Sanremo Young 1996 (Rai Uno, 1996)
Sanremo Rock 1997 (Rai Uno, 1997)
Destinazione sanremo (Rai Uno, 2002)
Ti lascio una canzone (Rai 1, 2008–2009)
Io canto (Canale 5, 2010–2013)

References

Bibliography

External links

Sanremo Music Festival - Official website
Festivaldisanremo.com – Independent website on Sanremo Music Festival since 1998

Italian record producers
Talent agents
1952 births
Living people
Italian Italo disco musicians
Musicians from the Metropolitan City of Venice
Italian radio personalities